KBTN-FM (99.7 FM) is a radio station broadcasting a classic country format. Licensed to Neosho, Missouri, United States, the station serves the Joplin area.  The station is currently owned by Ffd Holdings I, Inc.

References

External links

BTN-FM
Radio stations established in 1982
1982 establishments in Missouri